The Ehroflug Coach II S is a Swiss ultralight aircraft, designed by Egon Scheibe and produced by Ehroflug of Altnau. It was introduced in 1989. The aircraft is supplied as plans, as a kit for amateur construction or as a complete ready-to-fly-aircraft.

Design and development
The aircraft was designed to comply with the Fédération Aéronautique Internationale microlight rules. It features a strut-braced parasol wing a two-seats-in-side-by-side configuration open cockpit, fixed conventional landing gear and a single engine in tractor configuration.

The aircraft fuselage is made from welded steel tubing, with the wing built from aluminium tubing with wooden ribs. The airframe is covered in doped aircraft fabric. The wings are quickly detachable for storage. Standard engines available are the  Sauer 2.1 four-stroke Volkswagen air-cooled engine and the  Rotax 582 two-stroke powerplant.

While still in production in 2015, the aircraft was only built on request.

Specifications (Coach II S)

References

External links

1980s Swiss ultralight aircraft
Homebuilt aircraft
Single-engined tractor aircraft
Parasol-wing aircraft